Lettermuckoo is a townland in County Galway, Ireland. It lies in an Irish-speaking (Gaeltacht) area, close to the villages of Screeb and Casla (Costelloe). The local national (primary) school, Scoil Naisiunta Leitir Mucú, closed in 2015 due to a lack of students.

Sport 

The stallion Lettermuckoo Lad is a Connemara pony born in 2001 in Lettermuckoo. Lettermuckoo Lad won a number of showjumping competitions, and finished 3rd in the "Performance Hunter for Connemara Ponies 8-15 years" category at the 2013 Dublin Horse Show.

References

Townlands of County Galway